Steve Drake (born April 20, 1954) is a pornographic actor and director. He has performed in over 800 films since the 1980s, and was inducted into the XRCO Hall of Fame in 1999.

Personal life
In his autobiography, Jerry Butler referred to Drake as "the Tom Selleck of smut", stating that he had a "solid foundation, a skyscraper with a mustache". Jenna Jameson mentioned Drake along with other colleagues when stating that it was "hard not to have intimate feelings about some of the actors I work with... How can you do all this stuff with these guys and then feel nothing for them?"

1987 incident
Drake testified in April, 1987 in San Fernando Municipal Court in a publicized case of two men, Charles Brickman and Thomas Ingalls, charged with felony pandering in the production of sex videotape shot in June, 1986. Drake had at the time, along with Stacey Donovan and Tracey Adams been hired by Cinderella Distributors, run by Brickman and Ingalls. Drake testified, saying that having sex "was just part of the description of my character. I did what I did according to the script. . . . I was there as an actor, and part of my job meant having sex". Drake was reportedly paid $300 for his participation in the event. The felony pandering charges were later dropped against Brickman when he (pleading no contest), agreed to testify against Ingalls. He had risked facing a sentence ranging between 3–13 years in prison.

References

External links
 
 
 
 

1954 births
Living people
American male pornographic film actors
American pornographic film directors